Power engineering software is software used to create models, analyze or calculate the design of Power stations, Overhead power lines, Transmission towers, Electrical grids, Grounding and Lightning systems and others. It is a type of application software which is used for power engineering problems, which are transformed into mathematical expressions.

History 
The first software programs for power engineering were created by the end of the 1960s for the purpose of monitoring power plants. In the following decades, Power engineering and Computer technologies were developed very fast. Software programs were created to collect data for power plants. One of the first computer languages used in Nuclear plants and Thermal plants was C (programming language).  The first power systems analysis program to feature a graphical user interface, IPSA, was designed in the mid-1970s. Further platforms for electrical power modelling were created by the end of the 1980s. Currently, the programming language Python, commonly used in French Nuclear plants, is used to write energy-efficient algorithms and software programs.

Classification

Power plants analysis software 

After 2000 begins to develop rapidly analytical programming and 3D modeling. Software products are being created for design power plants and their elements and connections. Programs are based on mathematical algorithms and computations. Power software as ETAP, CYME, DINIS, IPSA, PSS/E and DIgSILENT are pioneers at the category power engineering software. Most of this product used MARKAL, ESME and other modelling methods. The transmission lines be designed according to minimum requirements set out in the SQSS (security and quality of supply standard). This also applies to other elements of the power systems. In the software world, were developed many CAD software products for 2D and 3D electrical design.

Renewable energy controller software 
The controllers of Renewable energy used different software. The digital controllers are different types: ADC, DAC, 4-bit, 8-bit, 16-bit, and many others. The controllers most of the time to this date are programmed with computer languages like:C,C++,Java and others.

Power engineering protection software 
Another kind of software is one for simulating security systems for power systems and power plants. Such software simulates the activating the various types of protections, which protects the transformers, power lines and other components. graph of different characteristics of the protections. Mathematical models have been set for all components of the power engineering system. It is up to the user to choose what type of protection to put on the energy objects. Protections are also mathematically modeled when they are connected to power engineering objects. The parameters of the emergency are set and based on the mathematical model, all the calculations are performed to obtain the output graphs and results.

Software products

System Analysis

The software products are created to solve different problems and to make different analysis of the power engineering.

Grounding grid analysis
Power generation analysis
Transmission line analysis
Renewable energy analysis
Distribution system analysis

See also 
Top ten rules for power plant condition monitoring
Power plants monitoring
 Wind energy software

References 
 Julius Tou Software Engineering
 J.R. McDonald, Stephen McArthur Intelligent knowledge based systems in electrical power engineering
 Stephanie Hay, Anna Ferguson A Review of Power System Modelling Platforms and Capabilities,TNEI Services
 Ana Cavalcanti, Augusto Sampaio, James Woodcock Refinement Techniques in Software Engineering: First Pernambuco Summer
 Bjorklund, P., Pan, J., Yue, C., Srivastava, K., “A New Approach for Modelling Complex Power System Components in Different Simulation Tools”,
Innovation in Power, Control, and Optimization Emerging Energy Technologies Vasant, Pandian

Specific

Power engineering
Industrial software